Soil & "Pimp" Sessions (stylised as SOIL&"PIMP"SESSIONS) is a Japanese club jazz sextet who formed in Tokyo, Japan, in 2001. They are known for their energetic live performances, having coined the term "death jazz" to describe their music.

History
The band was born out of Tokyo's club scene, when Shacho and Tabu Zombie started including live jam sessions in DJ sets. Gradually the other members were invited, the band's line-up was finalised and the DJ sets dropped.

The band's live sets started to create a buzz on the Tokyo live scene, and in 2003 they became the first unsigned band to perform at Japan's Fuji Rock Festival. They were well received there and in the following months record companies were scrambling to offer contracts. JVC Victor won the battle, and summer 2004 saw the release of the mini-album Pimpin'''.

The album was a critical and commercial success, and this together with constant touring paved the way for the release of their first full album, Pimp Master in early 2005. The album captures the power of their live performances as well as highlighting their individual musical talents. Two tracks in particular, "Waltz For Goddess" and their cover of "A Wheel Within a Wheel", caught the attention of DJs abroad, and they began to receive heavy air-play on Gilles Peterson's Worldwide radio program on BBC Radio 1 in the U.K.

Summer 2005 was a busy time for the band, with the release of their second mini-album, Summer Goddess, and their first live dates outside Japan. Gilles Peterson invited them to play at Cargo in London, and Jazzanova invited them to play in Berlin.

They spent the rest of the year touring in Japan and Europe, and they were also featured in the live broadcast of the Gilles Peterson Worldwide Awards in 2005, where they were awarded the John Peel Play More Jazz Award.

A second full album, Pimp of the Year, was released in spring 2006, showcasing innovations that showed a development of their sound, as well as one or two tracks that marked a new departure.

2006 also saw the official release of Pimp Master in Europe on Compost Records and the UK on Gilles Peterson's Brownswood Recordings label. They continued touring constantly throughout the year, taking in Britain, Italy, France, Serbia, Belgium, Germany, Slovakia and Croatia, as well as an appearance at the Montreux Jazz Festival.

March 2007 saw the release of their third full album, Pimpoint, on the Victor Entertainment label, which features thirteen tracks.

Soil & "Pimp" Sessions' song "Paraiso" is the opening theme for the anime Michiko to Hatchin.

A side project, called "J.A.M.", was formed by members Josei (piano), Akita Goldman (double bass) and Midorin (drums) in 2007. The name of the band is derived from the first letters of each member's name. The project features a notable different sound, combining house, hip-hop and the "rocking jazz of now". The band has released four albums, with their first album, Just A Maestro, being released in 2008, followed by Just Another Mind in 2010, Jazz Acoustic Machine in 2012 and Silent Notes in 2017.

"Agitator" Shacho announced during their performance at the Relentless Garage in London that their latest album  6  was due for release on 26 April 2010 in the United Kingdom. No other release locations were confirmed by him at the time.

On 8 December 2010, Soil and "Pimp" Sessions released their album, "SOIL&"PIMP"SESSIONS Presents STONED PIRATES RADIO", containing 20 tracks. All of the tracks (aside from the occasional skit tracks) are covers, arranged in various ways using their style. From reggae to calypso to their aggressive jazz sound, you can hear tracks like "Walkie-Talkie Man," "Beat It," and "Imagine."

Around September 2011, they announced that a new album will be released shortly, and that release was "MAGNETIC SOIL", containing all new material of 15 tracks (except track 2 is their rendition of the Brecker Brothers' piece "Some Skunk Funk"), including a new version of the track "Summer Goddess."

On August 7, 2013, they released their ninth album, Circles, which featured collaborations with Japanese artists from various genres, including Miyavi, Rhymester and Ringo Sheena. The album also featured a track, titled "Summer Love", featuring American Jazz hip-hop vocalist José James. Tim Conley aka MAST plays guitar on track 8  "記憶の旅 (Kioku no Tavi)".

At the end of 2016, Motoharu (Sax) left the band and they entered a "charging phase", meaning they were on hiatus.  In 2017, the band returned without Motoharu with the release of their album "Music from and inspired by Hello Harinezumi".  The band were joined by Takeshi Kurihara (Sax & Flute) on this and all future albums.

Members
 President a.k.a. Shacho , born January 18, 1978, in Takefu, Fukui Prefecture, agitator
 Tabu Zombie , born April 13, 1977, in Kagoshima, Kagoshima Prefecture, trumpet
 Josei , born October 30, 1975, in the Saeki-ku Ward of Hiroshima, Hiroshima Prefecture, piano, keyboards
 Akita Goldman , born July 8, 1977, in Hachiōji, Tokyo, double bass
 Midorin , born January 30, 1978, in Iwaki, Fukushima Prefecture, drums

Support musicians
 Takeshi Kurihara , saxophone, flute

Former members
 Motoharu , born June 29, 1973, in Nayoro, Hokkaido, saxophone

 Discography 
 Studio albums 

 Live albums 

 Compilation albums 

 Extended plays 

 Singles 

 Singles as lead artist 

 Singles as a featured artist 

References

External links
 – official site

Soil & "Pimp" Sessions on Last.fm
Shacho interview by Michael 'The Dood' Edwards in UK Vibe'', July 2010
Pimp Master review at Big Chill

Japanese jazz ensembles
Jazz fusion ensembles
Musical groups from Tokyo
Brownswood Recordings artists